Gordy Carbone a.k.a. Gordy Forgotten a.k.a. Gordon Carbone is an American entertainer from California. Carbone plays in the punk bands The Forgotten and Lars Frederiksen & the Bastards. He also has an online cooking show named "Eat Me!" and has appeared on the Food Network grilling with Iron Chef Bobby Flay on Bobby's show, "Grill It!, with Bobby Flay". Carbone was a show host for XM Satellite for several years, co-hosting Rancid Radio with Rancid's Lars Frederiksen.

References

External links 
 The Forgotten (band)
 Eat Me

American entertainers
Living people
People from Napa, California
Musicians from the San Francisco Bay Area
Lars Frederiksen and the Bastards members
Year of birth missing (living people)